Jamison is a Scottish or northern Irish name, literally meaning "son of James", and found as both a male given name and a surname. As the latter, it may refer to:

 Al Jamison (1937–2021), American football player
 Antawn Jamison, American basketball player
 Bud Jamison, American film actor. 
 Brandon Jamison, American football linebacker
 Herbert Jamison, American athlete
 John Jameson, Scottish businessman and founder of Jameson Irish Whiskey
 Sir John Jamison, Ulster-Scots Knight, doctor of medicine, and pioneer Australian land owner
 Jimi Jamison (1951–2014), American singer-songwriter, frontman of the rock band Survivor
 Joniece Jamison, American singer and backing vocalist
 Judith Jamison, Dancer, Ailven Ailey Dance Company
 Kay Redfield Jamison, American psychologist and psychiatry professor
 Linda and Terry Jamison, "psychic twins"
 Mae Jemison, Astronaut
 Norm Jamison, Canadian politician
 Thomas Jamison, Ulster-Scots naval surgeon, First Fleet settler and a Surgeon-General of New South Wales, Australia
 Vontrell Jamison, American football player

References

See also
 Jameson (name)
 Jamieson (disambiguation)
 Jamison (disambiguation)

Patronymic surnames
Surnames from given names